Cecil King (6 August 1881 – 9 December 1942) was a British painter. His work was part of the painting event in the art competition at the 1928 Summer Olympics.

References

1881 births
1942 deaths
20th-century British painters
British male painters
Olympic competitors in art competitions
People from Hounslow
19th-century British male artists
20th-century British male artists